Frederick Koehler (born June 16, 1975) is an American actor best known for his role as Chip Lowell on Kate & Allie as well as Andrew Schillinger on the HBO drama Oz.

Later life
After Kate & Allie, Koehler attended Carnegie Mellon University, from where he said he received "a huge education in theater."

Filmography 

(1983) Mr. Mom – Alex Butler
(1987) The Pick-up Artist – Richie
(1991) A Kiss Before Dying – Mickey
(2001) Pearl Harbor – Wounded Sailor #3
(2002) Divine Secrets of the Ya-Ya Sisterhood – Pete Abbott
(2002) A.K.A. Birdseye – Ben Sharpless
(2005) Dependency – Dave
(2005) Domino – Chuckie
(2005) Touched – Thomas Martin
(2006) Little Chenier – Pemon Dupuis
(2008) Death Race – Lists
(2010) Death Race 2 – Lists
(2013) Death Race 3: Inferno – Lists
 (2017) The Evil Within – Dennis
 (2018) Death Race: Beyond Anarchy – Lists
 (2021) The Little Things – Stan Peters

Television 

(1982-1985) Saturday Night Live - Young Howard Cosell/Various Roles
(1984) The Almost Royal Family (TV movie) – Jimmy Henderson
(1984) He's Fired, She's Hired (TV movie) – Lexy Grier
(1984–1989) Kate & Allie – Chip Lowell (98 episodes)
(1985) Tender Places (TV movie) – Eric
(1989) Night Walk (TV movie) – Eric Miller
(1993) The Positively True Adventures of the Alleged Texas Cheerleader-Murdering Mom (TV movie) – Shane Harper
(1997-1998) All My Children – Oyster Cracker (episode 7220)
(1999) Paramour (TV miniseries) – Unknown
(1999-2003) Oz – #99S333 Andrew Schillinger (4 episodes)
(1999) Strangers with Candy – Ricky (Season 1, episode 5 "Bogie Nights")
(2000) Bull – Joey Rutigliano (recurring cast)
(2001) CSI Crime scene investigation – Danny Hillman (Season 1, episode 12 "Fahrenheit 932")
(2002) Charmed – Necron's Lackey (Season 5, episode 1 "A Witch's Tail")
(2002) NYPD Blue - Michael Cardillo (Season 10, episode 10 "Healthy McDowell Movement")
(2002) Taken (TV miniseries) – Lester
(2004) Touching Evil (TV miniseries)
(2004) Cold Case – Neil Beaudry (Season 2, episode 6 "The Sleepover")
(2004) Malcolm in the Middle – Mellon (Season 5, episode 9 "Dirty Magazine")
(2004) Joan of Arcadia – Ramsey (Season 1, episode 11 "The Uncertainty Principle")
(2004) Boston Legal - Jason Binder (Season 1, episode 5 "Eye for an Eye")
(2006) Pepper Dennis – Leslie Gaye (recurring cast))
(2008) The Mentalist – Tommy Olds (Season 1, episode 9 "Flame Red")
(2009) Castle – Adam Pike (Season 1, episode 8 "Ghost")
(2010) Lost – Seamus (Season 6 recurring cast)
(2011) Torchwood: Miracle Day – Ralph Coltrane (Season 4, episode 5 "The Categories of Life", 6 "The Middle Men")
(2011) Bones – Scott Kimper (Season 6, episode 7 "The Babe in the Bar")
(2011) Southland – a junky (Season 3, episode 8 "Fixing a Hole")
(2012) Grimm – Martin Burgess (Season 1, episode 9 "Of Mouse and Man")
(2013) NCIS – Simon Gravy (Season 10, episode 23 "Double Blind")
(2013) Criminal Minds –  Wallace Hines and Jesse Gentry (Season 9, episodes 1 "The Inspiration", 2 "The Inspired")
(2014) Perception – George "The Ghost" (Season 3, episode 2 "Painless")
(2015) Backstrom – Wesley Lewis (Season 1, episode 5 "Bogeyman")
(2015) CSI: Cyber – Oliver Crispin (Season 2 episode 4 "Red Crone")
(2016) Major Crimes – Sean Wheeler (Season 5, episode 8 "Off the Wagon")
(2016) American Horror Story: Roanoke - Lot Polk (Season 6, 4 episodes)
(2017) Brooklyn Nine-Nine – Becca Boyle (Season 5, episode 9 "99", Season 8, episode 7 "Game of Boyles")
(2019) NCIS: New Orleans – Elliot Whitman (Season 6, episode 3 "Bad Apple")

 Theatre work 
(1998) The Cripple of Inishmaan – (Geffen Playhouse, Los Angeles) – Cripple Billy
(1998) When I Was a Girl I Used to Scream and Shout – (New York City) – Ewan
(2013) The Normal Heart'' - (Los Angeles) - Mickey Marcus

References

External links
 
 
 

1975 births
American male child actors
American male film actors
American male television actors
Living people
Male actors from New York City
Carnegie Mellon University College of Fine Arts alumni
People from Queens, New York